Grassy Creek Historic District is a national historic district located near Grassy Creek, Ashe County, North Carolina. The district encompasses 38 contributing buildings and 27 contributing structures in the small agricultural community of Grassy Creek. They include farmhouses and related agricultural outbuildings related to the Greer family, early settlers of Grassy Creek. The oldest building is the Aquilla Greer House (c. 1812 – 1817). Located in the district is the Grassy Creek Methodist Church (1904).

It was listed on the National Register of Historic Places in 1976.

References

Historic districts on the National Register of Historic Places in North Carolina
Farms on the National Register of Historic Places in North Carolina
Buildings and structures in Ashe County, North Carolina
National Register of Historic Places in Ashe County, North Carolina